Scopula acutanellus is a moth of the family Geometridae. It was described by Claude Herbulot in 1992. It is endemic to Cameroon.

References

Moths described in 1992
acutanellus
Endemic fauna of Cameroon
Taxa named by Claude Herbulot
Moths of Africa